Tomás López da Torre (1900 – October 1, 1936) was a Spanish lawyer, alcalde and supporter of the Second Spanish Republic during the Spanish Civil War. He was born in Betanzos. He was executed by the Nationalists of Francisco Franco during the White Terror (Spain).

References
Entrada , en el Diccionario biográfico del socialismo español.

1900 births
1936 deaths
20th-century Spanish lawyers
Alcaldes of the Second Spanish Republic
People from Betanzos
Victims of the White Terror (Spain)